The Beretta 93R is an Italian selective-fire machine pistol, designed and manufactured by Beretta in the late 1970s for police and military use, that is derived from their semi-automatic Beretta 92. The "R" stands for Raffica, which is Italian for "volley", "flurry", or "burst" (sometimes spoken "R" as "Rapid" in English).

History
The Beretta 93R was designed to be used by the Italian counter-terrorism forces of the national police Nucleo Operativo Centrale di Sicurezza and Carabineri Gruppo di Intervento Speciale (both formed in the late 1970s in response to terrorism) but was also adopted by other police and military forces who required a concealable weapon with rapid fire capabilities. The pistol is a development of the Beretta 92 design.

Mechanics
The Beretta 93R is mechanically similar to the Beretta 92. It can be selected to fire either a three round burst or single fire. A selector switch enables the operator to alternate between the two firing modes. The pistol is fitted with a collapsible angled foregrip at the front end of the trigger guard to provide better stability when firing. A folding steel buttstock can be attached at the heel of the grip. The Beretta 93R is much more controllable compared to other machine pistols because it was designed with only a three round burst mode as well as a ported barrel.

Users

References

External links
 Modern Firearms
  

Beretta firearms
93R
9mm Parabellum machine pistols
Machine pistols
Military equipment introduced in the 1970s